Gremlins 2: The New Batch  is a 1990 American black comedy horror film, and the sequel to the 1984 film Gremlins. It was directed by Joe Dante and written by Charles S. Haas, with creature designs by Rick Baker. Zach Galligan, Phoebe Cates, Dick Miller, Jackie Joseph, and Keye Luke reprise their roles from the first film; Belinda Balaski also returns, this time playing a different character. New cast members include John Glover, Robert Prosky, Haviland Morris, Robert Picardo, and Christopher Lee; additionally, the film features Tony Randall providing the voice for one of the gremlins. The story continues the adventures of the creature Gizmo (once again voiced by Howie Mandel), who spawns numerous small monsters when wet. In the first film, Gizmo's offspring rampaged through a small fictional town. In Gremlins 2: The New Batch, Gizmo multiplies within a skyscraper in New York City after his owner dies. The new creatures thus pose a serious threat to the city should they be able to leave the building, and the story revolves around the human characters' efforts to prevent this disaster.

Like the first film, Gremlins 2: The New Batch is a live-action horror comedy film; however, Dante put effort into taking the sequel in new anarchistic directions. Dante created the film to act almost as a parody of the original Gremlins, and it is meant to be more cartoon-like and less dark than the original. Its violence leans more towards slapstick, so the film received a PG-13 rating by the Motion Picture Association of America (MPAA). There are also a number of parodies of other films and stories, including the Rambo films, The Wizard of Oz, Marathon Man and The Phantom of the Opera. When released into theaters on June 15, 1990 Gremlins 2: The New Batch was a box office disappointment, grossing only $41.5 million on a budget of $30–50 million. Despite its mixed critical reception when it first released, it has since developed a cult following.

Plot 
The film opens at an undisclosed date in December close to Christmas. After his owner Mr. Wing dies, the mogwai Gizmo becomes the guinea pig of scientists at a lab in the Clamp Center, a state-of-the-art highrise building in Manhattan owned by eccentric billionaire Daniel Clamp. At the mercy of the chief researcher Dr. Catheter, Gizmo is rescued by his former owner Billy Peltzer and his fiancée Kate, both of whom work elsewhere in the building. Clamp befriends Billy upon being impressed by his skills in concept design, sparking the interest of Billy's superior Marla Bloodstone. Gizmo is left in the office, where water spills on his head from a broken drinking fountain and spawns four new mogwai. They cage Gizmo in the air vents and later eat at the building's food court after midnight, becoming gremlins.

After Gizmo escapes from the vent, Mohawk captures and tortures him. The other gremlins set off the fire sprinklers and spawn a gremlin army that throws the building into chaos. Billy attempts to lure the gremlins into the lobby, where sunlight will kill them; after Billy briefs Clamp on gremlin knowledge, Clamp exits through a secret tunnel to cover the front of the building in a giant sheet to trick the creatures. The gremlins drink genetic serums in the lab; one becomes the intelligent Brain Gremlin, another gremlin becomes female, and a third becomes a being of pure electricity and kills Dr. Catheter before Billy traps it in the building's telephone system. All the while, television host "Grandpa Fred" films the chaos, aided by Japanese tourist Mr. Katsuji.

Murray Futterman, Billy's neighbor from Kingston Falls who is visiting New York City with his wife Sheila, is attacked by a bat-gremlin hybrid immunized to sunlight by the Brain Gremlin with "genetic sunblock". After fending it off, Murray realizes that he is not crazy and has to help; when Clamp escapes the building using his secret route, Murray uses it to sneak inside to aid Billy. Billy and chief of security Forster team up, but the enamored female gremlin chases Forster off. Mohawk drinks a spider serum and transforms into a monstrous gremlin-spider hybrid. He attacks Kate and Marla, but Gizmo saves them by killing Mohawk with an ignited bottle of white-out.

Billy's plan to kill the gremlins by flooding the lobby with sunlight fails when rain clouds block the sun. He instead directs Murray to spray the gremlins with a fire hose, then releases the electric one from the telephone to electrocute and melt them all. Clamp charges in with the police and press, but sees the conflict is resolved; thrilled by the result, he promotes Billy, Kate, Fred, and Marla and hires Mr. Katsuji as a cameraman. Billy and Kate then return home with Gizmo. Forster calls Clamp to notify him that he is trapped at the highest floor of the building. The female gremlin, nicknamed "Greta" and the sole survivor of the horde, corners him and entices him to marry her.

Cast 

The film has various crew and guest cameos: Jerry Goldsmith as a yogurt customer, John Astin as a janitor, and Henry Gibson as an employee fired for smoking. Rick Ducommun cameos as a security guard, and Joe Dante as the director of Grandpa Fred's show. Dick Butkus and Bubba Smith cameo as themselves getting attacked at the salad bar. The cast of the PBS children's show Square One TV appear as themselves filming an episode in the lobby of the Clamp building. Dean Norris and Raymond Cruz, who both would later gain prominence on the acclaimed television series Breaking Bad as well as its spin-off Better Call Saul, appear in the film as a SWAT team member and delivery man respectively.

Voices 

 Howie Mandel as Gizmo
 Tony Randall as Brain Gremlin
 Frank Welker as Mohawk
 Kirk Thatcher and Mark Dodson as Gremlins
 Jeff Bergman as Bugs Bunny, Daffy Duck and Porky Pig (uncredited)
 Neil Ross as announcer
 Michael Sheehan as special vocal effects (uncredited)

Looney Tunes segments 
The film includes animated segments written and directed by Chuck Jones and featuring the Looney Tunes characters Bugs Bunny, Daffy Duck and Porky Pig. Jones had retired from animation before returning to work on Gremlins 2: The New Batch. Dante explained the animation at the beginning of the film was meant to "set the anarchic tone."

The first scene initiates the film and features the classic Looney Tunes opening card, causing people to assume it is the short cartoon that usually plays before a movie begins; however, when Bugs appears through the rings on top of the Warner Bros. shield, Daffy interrupts the intro, and steals the shield from Bugs. Daffy attempts to recreate the opening with himself in Bugs' place, but the shield overshoots, causing the entire title card to fall apart. Daffy surrenders the stardom, claiming that since he will not star in the cartoon, they might as well just skip straight to the movie. Bugs is willing to do so, and spins Daffy off screen like a spinning top for the movie title to appear.

The DVD and Blu-ray include a longer version of the cartoon short. In it, Daffy is informed by Bugs that he has been promoted to executive and is subsequently put in charge writing the title of the movie. When Daffy mistakenly writes the title Gremlins 2 as "Gremlin Stew", Bugs corrects the error. Daffy then attempts to rename the film The Return of Super-Daffy Meets Gremlins 2 Part 6: The Movie, but Bugs rejects this for being too long, changing it back to Gremlins 2 (rendered in the font of the official logo). Daffy then quits his new job and Bugs decides to add in the subtitle, saying it looks "a little skimpy". This material was removed from the film because early audiences expected a live-action film and were bewildered by the lengthy animated sequence.

Throughout the film's closing credits, Daffy pops into frame sporadically and spouts off sarcastic comments. The last scene appears after the credits, and again features the Looney Tunes rings. This time, Porky comes out of the rings and tries to say his usual "Th-th-th-that's all, folks!" However, Daffy interrupts again and takes over. After Daffy says the slogan, the back of the Warner Bros. shield, with the words, "Title Animation Written & Directed by Chuck Jones (with Chuck Jones' signature)", smashes him. He peeks his head out to the left side and says, "Fade out," and the segment ends.

Production 
The original Gremlins was a financial success, and Warner Bros. asked its director Joe Dante to make a sequel straight away. Dante declined, because he saw Gremlins as having a proper ending, and thus a sequel would only be meant to be profitable. Moreover, the original film was a taxing experience for Dante, and he wanted to move on. Work on Gremlins 2: The New Batch continued without him, as the studio approached various directors and writers. Storylines considered included sending the gremlins to cities like Las Vegas or even the planet Mars. After these ideas fell through, the studio returned to Dante, who agreed to make the sequel after receiving the rare promise of having complete creative control over the movie; he also received a budget triple that of the original film. Dante later acknowledged that by this point too much time had passed between the films, thus possibly reducing public interest in a Gremlins sequel.

Gremlins 2: The New Batch was shot in New York City in June 1989 and released in 1990. As the filmmakers noted, this was a time when cable television, genetics, and frozen yogurt were becoming more common in popular culture, hence are all parodied in the movie.

Plotting 
With more control over the film, Dante engineered a project that he later referred to as "one of the more unconventional studio pictures, ever." Dante included some material that he believed Warner Bros. would not have allowed had they not wanted a sequel to Gremlins. Allowed to break a number of rules in filmmaking, he also later claimed it was the film into which he had put the most of his personal influence. Dante imagined Gremlins 2: The New Batch as a satire of Gremlins and sequels in general.

Screenwriter Charlie Haas introduced the concept of moving the gremlins to New York City and a corporate head (Daniel Clamp) as Billy's boss. When the Warner Bros. executives grew concerned about the expense of portraying the gremlins attacking an entire city, Haas came up with the idea of confining the action within Clamp's "smart building". Haas also included a great deal of material in his screenplay that proved too elaborate to produce, including having a cow–hamster hybrid running on a treadmill in the laboratory.

In keeping with Dante's desires to satirize the original film, the sequel has some meta-references and self-referential humor. These include a cameo appearance by film critic Leonard Maltin. He holds up a copy of the original Gremlins home video and denounces it, just as he had in reality; however, his rant is cut short when gremlins pounce on him. Partly for this scene, one academic called Dante "one of contemporary cinema's great pranksters."

Additionally, when Billy is trying to explain the rules regarding the mogwai to staff in the building, the staff finds them quite absurd and derisively interrogates Billy on their precise meaning; at one point considering the thought experiment of a mogwai in a plane which crosses a time zone. This scene originates from the fact that the filmmakers themselves saw the rules as irrational, and some questions in the scene were based upon those raised by fans of the original film.

At one point in the film, Dante attempted to involve his audience in the story by making it seem as if the gremlins had taken control of the theatre where Gremlins 2: The New Batch was showing. The filmstrip appears to be broken by the gremlins, who then engage in shadow puppetry over a white screen before replacing the reel with the vintage nudie film Volleyball Holiday. Hulk Hogan then makes a cameo appearance as an audience member and intimidates the gremlins into running the rest of Gremlins 2: The New Batch. This joke was inspired by a similar stunt in William Castle's film The Tingler (1959). The studio feared that people might leave the theatre if they thought the film had broken; Dante therefore secured the inclusion of the sequence by assembling some people for a preview of the film. When the scene was shown, the real-life audience found it enjoyable and stayed in the theatre. Dante later described this scene as one of the most widely enjoyed jokes in Gremlins 2.

When the film made its debut on home video, the filmmakers replaced the scene to make it seem as if the viewer's VCR had been broken by the gremlins. In this version, the gremlins do their shadow puppetry over white noise before changing the VCR's channels. Their antics stop at a broadcast of Chisum, where John Wayne forces the gremlins into continuing the film, although voice impersonation was needed since Wayne had been dead since 1979; actor Chad Everett was recommended by Wayne's son Patrick Wayne. Notably, a clip from Falling Hare, a film released in 1943 featuring Bugs Bunny and a gremlin, appears in this version.  Also featured is a clip of the opening titles of the KTHV local newscast at the time in Little Rock, Arkansas. These sequences occur in lieu of the Hulk Hogan sequence which also featured Paul Bartel; home video audiences would not see these sequences until the DVD and Blu-ray releases (which includes the reworked VHS scene as a bonus feature).

The original version of the film was longer, but executive producer Steven Spielberg claimed that there were too many gremlins, and several scenes were cut as a result. One deleted scene portrayed three of the main gremlins, Daffy, Lenny, and George, sneaking into television host Grandpa Fred's studio and "helping" him host, acting on the premise that Grandpa Fred's show was intended to be scary (though this scene was later included in the tie-in novel).

Casting 
Several actors from the original film returned to make Gremlins 2: The New Batch, including Galligan, Cates, and Dick Miller. Miller reprised his role as Billy's neighbor Mr. Futterman, who the gremlins severely injured (both physically and mostly mentally) in the first film, in an expanded role in this film. In the second, he plays a part in wiping out the creatures by dousing one in cement and using the building's fire hose against the others. Character actress Jackie Joseph returned to play Mr. Futterman's wife, and there were also brief reappearances in the movie theatre sequence from Belinda Balaski as a complaining mother and Kenneth Tobey as the projectionist. Keye Luke also returned to play Mr. Wing, Gizmo's original owner. When Luke heard his character would die in Gremlins 2: The New Batch, he quipped, "Remember, when you make Gremlins 3, I'm a flashback!". Hoyt Axton was meant to return as Billy's father, the inventor. He would have appeared at the end of the film, having designed special clothing for Gizmo that would ensure Gizmo would never come into contact with water again. At the last moment, the filmmakers decided not to shoot the scene to reduce time.

New performers included Robert Picardo, who had previously worked with Dante and producer Michael Finnell in films such as The Howling (1981) and Innerspace (1987). He plays Forster, one of Billy's crueler bosses. Robert Prosky played Grandpa Fred, a television host, and his character was based upon Al Lewis's character Grandpa Munster. Joe Dante has a brief cameo as the director of Grandpa Fred's show. John Glover played Clamp (character based upon Donald Trump and Ted Turner) and brought to the role an enthusiastic innocence that overrode the fact that his character had been written as a villain, which Dante thought lightened the film in general.

Christopher Lee (who previously worked with Spielberg in 1941) played the mad scientist Dr. Catheter. Lee imagined his role as light-hearted; but Dante encouraged him to portray the scientist as evil to better match the atmosphere of the laboratory set. Lee was revered on the set for his experience. In a deleted scene, Dr. Catheter examines a bat injected with "genetic sun-block". He then says to his colleague, "I'm told they sometimes feed on blood"; this is a reference to Lee's performances as Count Dracula in the Hammer Horror films. Later, as the Bat Gremlin is transforming, Dr. Catheter experiences déjà vu (the audience hears Dracula music). The doctor's first name, Cushing, is a reference to Lee's frequent Hammer co-star, and best friend, Peter Cushing.

Leonard Maltin, movie critic for Entertainment Tonight, had given a negative review to the first Gremlins film. While Dante was initially hurt by the review, he invited Maltin to film a cameo as the movie critic of a fictional Clamp Cable Network show, The Movie Police. Maltin gives a snide review for the video re-release of the first film along the lines of his original review before being assaulted by gremlins, pleading, "I was just kidding! It's a ten! A ten!"

Special effects 

For special effects, the original film relied on Chris Walas, who moved on to pursue a directing career. Dante turned to Academy Award-winner Rick Baker to create the effects for Gremlins 2: The New Batch. Baker was not interested, as he saw Gremlins 2: The New Batch as too much work for a project in which he would not be the creator but rather a successor to Walas. He was eventually persuaded to accept the job when it was suggested he could make the gremlins and mogwai more diverse.

In the first film, when Gizmo multiplied, his offspring closely resembled himself, except for the leader, Stripe. Here, the four mogwai Gizmo produces each possess their own distinct personalities and physical features. Additionally, each mogwai has a name, although the names were used in the script and never spoken aloud in the film. Two of the mogwais were George, black without a stripe and a caricature of Edward G. Robinson, and Lenny, buck-toothed, named for the principal characters in Of Mice and Men, whom they resemble in both appearance and demeanor. Daffy was named for his manic behavior, and the leader, Mohawk, for his mohawk hairstyle. Based on the original film's character, Stripe, Frank Welker also voices Mohawk. While both the mogwai and gremlin versions of Stripe had fur stripes, Baker hit upon the idea of giving the Mohawk mogwai a fur stripe and giving the Mohawk gremlin something scalier. Gizmo was also redesigned; the puppet was generally larger and its design was simplified. Dante commented Gizmo may look less real in Gremlins 2: The New Batch, but the result was that Gizmo could convey more emotion.

Later on, when the mogwai metamorphose into gremlins and multiply, they further diversify by running amok in the bio-lab and ingesting various drugs. One turns into a sunlight-resistant hybrid with a bat, thus becoming the Bat Gremlin. Mohawk becomes part-spider. One becomes part-vegetable (Vegetable Gremlin, as Dante named it), and another consumes a drug and turns into a female gremlin, referred to in at least one script as the "Girl Gremlin" and in the official trading card series and other promotional materials as "Lady Gremlina" with shiny red lips and mascara. Nowadays she is referred to as "Greta", after the late Greta Garbo. Yet another has acid thrown onto his face, quickly presenting a mask of the Phantom of the Opera.

As with the first, puppetry was involved, and some of the puppets were mechanical. An actor holding a puppet would have to have wires strapped to him. Gremlins 2 also includes more stop motion animation than the first film; the Bat Gremlin was portrayed through some stop motion animation. Film technology since the original had improved, and as a result the creatures can be seen walking more. Gizmo is able to dance, although this scene took the longest to make. Because there are more gremlins in Gremlins 2 than the original, additional filming lasted five months. Many of the effects had to be completed after the actors had finished their work.

For the gremlins' voices, Howie Mandel returned as the voice of Gizmo, while Tony Randall provided the voice of the Brain Gremlin, Frank Welker provided the voice for Mohawk, Mark Dodson provided voices for George, Lenny, and Daffy, Joe Dante provided voices for the Beanie Gremlin and the Witch Gremlin, Nancy McConnor provided the voice for the Bat Gremlin, while Kirk Thatcher provided voices for most of the gremlins, alongside Welker.

Music 

As with the first film, the music in Gremlins 2: The New Batch was composed and conducted by Jerry Goldsmith, who also has a cameo in the film alongside his wife. The song "I'm Ready" by Fats Domino was put into the film after singer Billy Idol denied the filmmakers the right to use the song "Dancing with Myself", so Joe Dante had to find a song that fit the beat that Gizmo was dancing to. In the latter half of the film, Gizmo, inspired by the Rambo films and tired of the abuse he has suffered at the hands of the gremlins, takes revenge on Mohawk. Gizmo shoots the Mohawk spider-gremlin with a makeshift bow and flaming arrow. For the scene in which Gizmo prepares for this move, Goldsmith – who had also authored the music in the Rambo films – employed a variant of Gizmo's theme in the style of the Rambo theme. The soundtrack was released August 31, 1990 through Varèse Sarabande and features twelve tracks of score at a running time just under forty minutes. On June 22, 2015, an expanded release came from the same label.

The scene featuring Mohawk transforming into a spider-like monster features a portion of the song "Angel of Death" by thrash metal band Slayer. In another scene, the Brain Gremlin leads hundreds of gremlins to sing "New York, New York". Dante claimed that "The musical number is a shameless steal" from the film Dames (1934).

Song list 

 Fats Domino – "I'm Ready"
 Jeff Beck – "Sling Shot"
 Jeff Beck – "Situation"
 Slayer – "Angel of Death"
 Ice Spice – "Boy's a Liar Pt.2"
 Tony Randall – "New York, New York"
 Bach – Air on the G String
 Thompson Twins – "Bombers in the Sky"
 Damn Yankees – "Damn Yankees"
 Jasmine Guy – "Tuff Boy"
 Private Life – "Touch Me"
 Gordon Lightfoot – "If You Could Read My Mind"
 Faith No More – "Surprise! You're Dead!"
 George Gershwin – "Rhapsody in Blue"
 Playboi Carti - "Vamp Anthem"

Reception 
Film critics varied in their reviews of Gremlins 2: The New Batch. The site's consensus states; "Gremlins 2 trades the spiky thrills of its predecessor for looney satire, yielding a succession of sporadically clever gags that add some flavor to a recycled plot." Roger Ebert, who had approved of the first film, observed that Gremlins 2 was meant to satirize sequels. Nevertheless, he felt it did not manage to differentiate itself from the original enough and was not as good. He went on to claim that the film lacks a well-constructed plot, and once the gremlins arrived the film simply becomes a "series of gags." He thus gave the film two and a half stars, out of a possible four. Hal Hinson of The Washington Post caught on to how the Looney Tunes animation is meant to imply "anarchic wit," but nevertheless felt both the cartoon short and the film itself are failures. He saw the beginning as too slow and, like Ebert, thought the film is too similar to the first. Hinson did, however, approve of the characterization of the gremlins and their version of "New York, New York." He also noted that turning the gremlins against Clamp resembles anti-corporate "poetic justice."

In contrast, while one reviewer for Films in Review, like Ebert, argued the film resembles the original and abandons its plot when the gremlins arrive, he also felt the film's appeal could be found partly in its self-consciousness of these facts and its in-jokes and satire. He also complimented Cates as "wholesomely bewitching," and Galligan as "a suitably naive foil for the scaly fiends."
Desson Howe of The Washington Post also approved of the film, including its special effects and the parodies of Trump, Turner, genetics labs, cable television, and the film Marathon Man.
Some critics thought the film has qualities the original lacked, such as wit. A critic for National Review called the film "much freer and wittier than the first one," though he felt the sequel shies away from becoming an important piece of satire.
The cover of an issue of Entertainment Weekly in July 1990 also exclaimed that "actor John Glover... and director Joe Dante made Gremlins 2: The New Batch wittier, better, and more subversive than the original." Some critics who found the first film too dark also gave Gremlins 2: The New Batch more positive reviews. Leonard Maltin, who appears in the film, gave it three out of four stars for its references to other films, Glover's imitation of Turner and Trump, and Lee's performance. VideoHound's Golden Movie Retriever gave the film three-and-a-half bones out of four as opposed to the three bones given to the original, stating: 
An Allmovie critic complimented the sequel by saying the "original's violence and mean-spiritedness are gone, making this follow-up somewhat more kid-friendly." The film was nominated for several Saturn Awards, namely for Best Director, Best Fantasy Film, Best Music, and Best Special Effects. Glover and Picardo were both nominated for the Best Supporting Actor award.

Still, the film did not perform as well at the box office as the original. Gremlins 2: The New Batch was released into US theatres on June 15, 1990, the same day as Dick Tracy. In its first weekend it made $9,702,804, and it ultimately made $41,482,207. It was thus only the thirty-first highest-grossing film of the year, behind a few other films in the comedy, horror or fantasy genre, such as Back to the Future Part III ($87,727,583), Edward Scissorhands ($56,362,352), and Arachnophobia ($53,208,180). It did, however, outperform Predator 2 ($30,669,413), Child's Play 2 ($28,501,605) and The Exorcist III ($26,098,824).

Gremlins 2: The New Batch also played in other countries. Canadian audiences reportedly enjoyed one scene where Billy and his boss meet at a Canadian-themed restaurant, where the waiters are dressed like the Royal Canadian Mounted Police. The film was released in Norway on July 5, Finland on July 6, Colombia on July 12, and much of Europe in the rest of July, including in the United Kingdom and Spain on July 27. It opened in France and Argentina in August and reached Australia on September 20. It earned £7,400,000 in the United Kingdom.

Audiences polled by CinemaScore gave the film an average grade of "B+" on an A+ to F scale.

Merchandising 
As with the first film, merchandising accompanied Gremlins 2: The New Batch. This may have been integral to the film's purpose. As one critic wrote, "it's a savvy, off-the-wall comedy that acknowledges, yes, it is just one more silly rip-off sequel, produced to sell off the merchandise inspired by the first film." One reference the film makes to the original, an allusion to the merchandising surrounding Gizmo, drew criticism. Some critics saw the mention of merchandise as tasteless. This type of product placement has since become more common.

The new merchandise released alongside the film included PVC figures, plush, and other collectibles by the now-defunct Applause company in 1990. Much later, action figures by the National Entertainment Collectibles Association (NECA Toys) based on characters such as the Brain and Mohawk gremlins were released. NECA also planned to release mogwais and gremlins from the film in late 2011 and 2012; with mogwai and gremlin versions of Daffy, Lenny and George, as well as a mogwai version of Mohawk. The Electric gremlin, flasher gremlin and the Phantom of the Opera gremlin were also planned to be released in action figure form by NECA. There were also newer versions of Gizmo released, including his Rambo look. Greta, a newer version of Mohawk and Mohawk in Spider form were also being planned.

There were also children's books like Gremlins 2: The New Batch: Movie Storybook, by Michael Teitelbaum, published by Goldencraft in December 1990. Little Golden Books published Gremlins 2: The New Batch: Gizmo to the Rescue in July 1990. In the United Kingdom, William Heinemann Ltd. had published two tie-in picture books from Buzz Books in August 1990 which contains photographs and scenes taken from the film. They were titled Don't Get Wet and Midnight Feast. Buzz Books had also released other picture books that are particularly suitable for children such as Thomas the Tank Engine & Friends, Fireman Sam, TUGS, The Flintstones, The Animals of Farthing Wood, Looney Tunes, Bugs Bunny, Joshua Jones and Rupert. David Bischoff wrote a novel based on the film published by Avon Books in June 1990. A unique aspect of the novel is how Bischoff adapts the sequence where the film breaks. In the novel, the Brain Gremlin subdues and locks Bischoff in his bathroom before taking the reins for a little bit to explain that the gremlins take over at this point in the film, his displeasure at Bischoff using the nickname "Mr. Glasses" instead of his official name and begins a treatise on politics before Bischoff breaks his way out of the bathroom with an axe and subdues the Brain Gremlin. The novel then continues where the film picked up after the film break.

The Spanish company Topo Soft developed a side-scrolling Gremlins 2: The New Batch video game for Amiga, Atari ST, Commodore 64, DOS, MSX, Amstrad CPC and the ZX Spectrum, distributed by Erbe Software in Spain and by Elite abroad, being the first time a Spanish video game company got an exclusive license from a Hollywood movie to make a videogame. Hi Tech Expressions also released a DOS game at around the same time, but it was poorly received. Sunsoft released versions for the Nintendo Entertainment System and Game Boy in 1990.

Potential sequel 
In January 2013, Vulture reported that Warner Bros. was negotiating with Steven Spielberg's Amblin Entertainment to reboot the Gremlins franchise. Seth Grahame-Smith was tapped to produce, alongside David Katzenberg. However, Grahame-Smith has since stated that the project has been put on hold. In November 2015, Zach Galligan confirmed that the third film will be a sequel and not a reboot.

In a December 2016 interview with Bleeding Cool, Galligan said that Columbus had been "aggressively working on a Gremlins 3", which had writer Carl Ellsworth on board. A 2017 interview with Chris Columbus discussed his "twisted and dark" script which explored the idea that has been on the fans' minds for a long time: "If all the gremlins come from getting Gizmo wet and feeding his mogwai offspring after midnight, should Gizmo be eliminated?" In November 2020, Columbus stated that CGI would not be used for the gremlins and that traditional puppets and animatronics would continue to be used.

Notes

References

External links 

 
 
 
 
 Institute of Gremlins 2 Studies on twitter

1990 films
1990 comedy films
1990 horror films
1990s American films
1990s comedy horror films
1990s science fiction horror films
1990s monster movies
1990s English-language films
American comedy horror films
American dark fantasy films
American science fiction horror films
American monster movies
American sequel films
American films with live action and animation
Adventure horror films
Postmodern films
Puppet films
Gremlins (franchise)
Looney Tunes films
Bugs Bunny films
Daffy Duck films
Porky Pig films
Films about gremlins
Films about animation
Films set in New York City
Films set in a movie theatre
Films using stop-motion animation
Films directed by Joe Dante
Films scored by Jerry Goldsmith
Warner Bros. films
Amblin Entertainment films
ZX Spectrum games